The Skeoch was a Scottish cyclecar manufactured in 1921 by Skeoch Utility Car Company in Dalbeattie, Kirkudbrightshire.  It was powered by a 348 cc single-cylinder Precision engine and was fitted with a two-speed Burman gearbox with chain for its final-drive. 
At the Scottish Motor Show in 1921, the first Skeoch Utility Car was the cheapest on display and sold for £180 complete, or at a reduced cost of £165 without accessories. Around 10 were manufactured before the factory "The Burnside Motor Works" was destroyed by fire in December 1921.

On Saturday 17th July 2021 a recreation of the car was revealed at Colliston Park, Dalbeattie. The fully operative replica had been constructed by members of Dalbeattie Men's Shed charity and built from the original plans which had been offered from Fiona Sinclair, granddaughter of James Baird Skeoch who died in 1954. As few of these cars were made this is now the only known physical example of the Skeoch cyclecar.

See also
 List of car manufacturers of the United Kingdom

Further reading
David Burgess Wise, The New Illustrated Encyclopedia of Automobiles.

Skeoch Utility Car binder located in Dalbeattie Museum Trust at Southwick Road, Dalbeattie, Scotland, DG5 4BS

References 

Defunct motor vehicle manufacturers of Scotland
Cyclecars
Goods manufactured in Scotland
Vehicles introduced in 1921
1921 establishments in Scotland
History of Dumfries and Galloway
Companies based in Dumfries and Galloway
Car manufacturers of the United Kingdom